Ann Lee Doran (July 28, 1911 – September 19, 2000) was an American character actress, possibly best known as the mother of Jim Stark (James Dean) in Rebel Without a Cause (1955). She was an early member of the Screen Actors Guild and served on the board of the Motion Picture & Television Fund for 30 years.

Early years
The daughter of Carrie A. Barnett and John R. Doran, her mother was a silent-film actress whose professional name was Rose Allen. Ann Doran was born in Amarillo, Texas, and attended high school in San Bernardino, California.

Film career
Doran began acting at the age of four. (A 1979 newspaper article said that Doran's debut came when she was 11 years old.) Rarely in a featured role, Doran appeared in more than 500 motion pictures and 1,000 episodes of television series, such as the American Civil War drama Gray Ghost.

Doran worked as a stand-in, then bit player, then incidental supporting player. By 1938, she was under contract to Columbia Pictures, where the company policy was to use the members of its stock company as often as possible. Thus, Doran appears in Columbia's serials (such as The Spider's Web and Flying G-Men), short subjects (including those of The Three Stooges, Charley Chase, Andy Clyde, Harry Langdon and Vera Vague), B features (including the Blondie, Five Little Peppers and Ellery Queen series), and major feature films. She became a favorite of Columbia director Frank Capra and appears in many of his productions. Most of these appearances were supporting roles. In Meet John Doe(1941), she plays the wife of sodajerk-turned-John Doe Club activist Bert Hansen. Though her character speaks some of the film's most pivotal lines of dialog, including an impassioned suicide-preventing plea in the final scene, her appearance in the film is uncredited. She did play leads in Columbia's Charley Chase comedies from 1938 to 1940 and in one Charles Starrett western feature, the Sam Nelson-directed Rio Grande (1938).

Columbia filmed two boy-and-his-dog stories with juvenile star Ted Donaldson in 1945–46. When the Donaldson films became a full-fledged series (featuring the dog Rusty) in 1947, Doran was cast as Donaldson's mother in the next six films. Her steady, sensible maternal roles led to her being cast as James Dean's mother in Rebel Without a Cause.

Television
Doran played Charlotte McHenry, the housekeeper on Shirley, Agnes Haskell, Eddie Haskell's mother and in a separate appearance Mrs. Bellamy, in Leave It to Beaver and Mrs. Kingston, the housekeeper, on Longstreet.

Doran guest-starred on many television programs, including three appearances in the role of Bonnie Landis in Public Defender, starring with fellow Texan Reed Hadley. She appeared in the anthology series Crossroads in the 1956 episode "The White Carnation", along with Elinor Donahue, James Best and J. Carrol Naish. In 1952, she appeared in an episode of The Lone Ranger titled "Hidden Fortune".

Doran was cast in the children's Western series My Friend Flicka, the story of a boy and his horse on a ranch in Wyoming. She also appeared in episodes of Ray Milland's sitcom Meet Mr. McNutley and Kenneth Tobey's aviation adventure series Whirlybirds. Doran guest-starred on Perry Mason in "The Case of the Prodigal Parent" (1958), "The Case of the Lurid Letter" (1962) and "The Case of the Drowsy Mosquito" (1963) as well as in Rawhide in the episode "Incident of the Challenge".

Doran was cast twice in 1959–1960 in episodes of the series Colt .45, starring Wayde Preston. In 1960, she was cast as Martha Brown, the mother of horse rider Velvet Brown (Lori Martin) in the family drama National Velvet. She made one appearance on McHale's Navy as Mrs. Martha "Pumpkin" Binghamton, wife of Captain Binghamton (Joe Flynn). In 1963 Doran appeared as Minerva Lewis on The Virginian in the episode "Run Away Home."  Ann Doran was cast twice as Mrs. Elliott and Hugh Beaumont as Mr. Elliott,   parents of Steve Elliott (Mike Minor), in Petticoat Junction.

Three years later, she appeared in the first episode of The Legend of Jesse James as Zerelda James Samuel, the mother of Jesse and Frank James. She also appeared on the program M*A*S*H as Nurse Meg Cratty, who runs an orphanage in Korea. In the episode "The Kids", Cratty and her charges bunked with the M*A*S*H unit to avoid snipers.

Death
Doran died at age 89 on September 19, 2000, in Carmichael, California. Following her death, her remains were cremated and scattered at sea. She bequeathed $400,000 to the Motion Picture Country House, the retirement home for the movie industry.

Filmography

Films

Television

References

External links

 
 Ann Doran at Turner Classic Movies
 
 All Time Rebel {1955–2005 | 50th Anniversary}(  2009-10-25)
 Interview

1911 births
2000 deaths
20th-century American actresses
Actors from San Bernardino, California
Actresses from California
American child actresses
American film actresses
American silent film actresses
American television actresses
Columbia Pictures contract players